Martyna Galewicz (born 29 January 1989) is a Polish cross-country skier. She competed in the women's 15 kilometre skiathlon at the 2018 Winter Olympics.

Cross-country skiing results
All results are sourced from the International Ski Federation (FIS).

Olympic Games

World Championships

World Cup

Season standings

References

External links
 

1989 births
Living people
Polish female cross-country skiers
Olympic cross-country skiers of Poland
Cross-country skiers at the 2018 Winter Olympics
Sportspeople from Zakopane
Competitors at the 2015 Winter Universiade